Jitender Kumar (born 18 July 1988) is an Indian flyweight boxer. He won the bronze medal in the flyweight category at the 2006 Commonwealth Games. He represented India at the 2008 Summer Olympics in Beijing.

Career
At the 2006 Junior World Championships, he lost to future (2007) seniors world champion Sergey Vodopyanov. At the Commonwealth Games 2006 he lost his semifinal to eventual winner Don Broadhurst. At the 2nd Olympic qualifier he beat Noman Karim, lost his semi to Mirat Sarsembayev but won the all-important third place bout against Godfrey Castro 13:6 and qualified.

Beijing Olympics
At the 2008 summer Olympics, Jitender was pitted against Turkey's Ulas Furkan Memis in the round of 32. The referee stopped the contest in the third round of the bout when Jitender led 12-3. In the round of 16, he was up against Uzbek boxer Tulashboy Doniyorov. In an ill-tempered bout, Jitender outscored his opponent 13-6. However, his dream run at Beijing 2008 Olympics came to an end when he lost to Georgy Balakshin of Russia (11-15) in a tightly fought quarter finals match held at Workers Indoor Arena on 20 August 2008. Jitender had 9 stitches in his jaw during the quarterfinal. If blood came out then the referee would stop the match and this put him under tremendous pressure. He was coached by the Indian Boxing Coach Gurbaksh Singh Sandhu.

See also
 Boxing at the 2008 Summer Olympics – Flyweight
 Akhil Kumar
 Vijender Kumar

References

 Bio
 Olympics 2008 Bio

1988 births
Indian male boxers
Flyweight boxers
Living people
Commonwealth Games bronze medallists for India
Boxers at the 2008 Summer Olympics
Olympic boxers of India
Boxers at the 2006 Commonwealth Games
Boxers at the 2006 Asian Games
Commonwealth Games medallists in boxing
Boxers from Haryana
Asian Games competitors for India
Medallists at the 2006 Commonwealth Games